"Fiskarna i haven" (in English: "The Fish in the Sea") is a song written by Staffan Hellstrand and recorded by Idde Schultz for the 1995 album, Idde Schultz. It peaked at number-one in Sweden and number 10 in Norway. It was given the Rockbjörnen award in the "Swedish song of the year 1995" category.

Release
The song was released as a single the same year.

On 9 September 1995, the song entered Trackslistan, only to be knocked out the upcoming week.

The song was recorded by Väder-Annika acting as B-side for the 1996 single "Uteliggardjuren" ("Blame it on the Bossa Nova"). At Smurfhits 1 from 1996 it was called "Smurfarna i haven".

Critical reception
Music & Media wrote about the song: "A moody pop ballad that despite its Swedish-language lyrics, could find a spot on EHR playlists. The catchy tune is wrapped in an atmospheric and economic production that makes it highly suitable for daytime play."

Charts

Weekly charts

Year-end charts

References

1995 singles
Swedish-language songs
Swedish pop songs
Songs written by Staffan Hellstrand
Idde Schultz songs
1995 songs